Klaus Höhne (13 June 1927 in Hamburg – 21 August 2006 in Murnau am Staffelsee) was a German actor.  From 1971 until 1979 he starred in the Hessischer Rundfunk version of the popular television crime series Tatort. In 1974 he appeared in the very first episode of the popular TV series Derrick called "Waldweg".

Filmography

External links 
 

1927 births
2006 deaths
German male stage actors
German male television actors
German male film actors
20th-century German male actors
21st-century German male actors
Male actors from Hamburg
People from Garmisch-Partenkirchen (district)